Marian Farbák (born 10 February 1983 in Myjava) is a Slovak football player who is currently playing for TJ Jednota Brestovec in the Slovakian League.  He played in the Gambrinus liga in the Czech Republic between 2006 and 2008.

Marian is a product of the TJ Spartak Myjava youth academy.

External links
Official club website

Notes

1983 births
Living people
Slovak footballers
People from Myjava
Sportspeople from the Trenčín Region
Slovak expatriate sportspeople in the Czech Republic
Czech First League players
FC Fastav Zlín players
SK Kladno players
Expatriate footballers in the Czech Republic
1. FC Tatran Prešov players
Slovak Super Liga players
Negeri Sembilan FA players

Association football central defenders
Slovak expatriate footballers
Slovak expatriate sportspeople in Malaysia
Expatriate footballers in Malaysia